Wynyard Park, sometimes known as Wynyard Hall, is a large English country house near Stockton-on-Tees in County Durham. The house was the English family seat of the Vane-Tempest-Stewart family, Marquesses of Londonderry, an Anglo-Irish aristocratic dynasty, until it was sold to Sir John Hall in 1987.

The house

The building was originally designed by Benjamin Dean Wyatt and completed by Philip Wyatt between 1822 and 1830. The entrance front has 13 bays and a 6-column Corinthian portico.

The entrance hall resembles that of Mount Stewart, the family's estate in Northern Ireland. It has a coffered segmental tunnel vault with apses at both ends and in the middle. There was a large crystal chandelier suspended from the ceiling. The main octagonal centre hall extends the full height of the house and has a dome with caryatids around it and a skylight. There is also a mirrored drawing room with a gilded and painted ceiling, and a vast ballroom similar to that of the family's London residence, Londonderry House.

The family wing of the mansion was nicknamed the Duke's Wing, as it was named after the Duke of Wellington and his visit in 1827. This side of the house also held the Duke's Gallery, where the family housed their famed art collection when not in London.

Gardens
Many statues adorn the grand entrance court outside the house and a wide path leading to an obelisk.

At its height in the 19th century, the Wynyard Estate occupied  (28 km²) in Teesside. The grounds today include a  ornamental lake, a walled garden, two entrance lodges, three cottages, a former racing yard, and productive farmland.

Brief history
The house was started by Benjamin Dean Wyatt and finished by Philip Wyatt for Charles Vane, 3rd Marquess of Londonderry, a famous coal magnate and founder of Seaham Harbour. The marquess spent £130,000 to build and furnish the home. In 1841, just as the residence was being completed, a fire broke out and gutted the building; it was later restored and remodelled by Ignatius Bonomi.

There had been a house on the site since the Middle Ages, and the 3rd Marquess of Londonderry incorporated parts of an earlier 18th-century building into his home.

He also sat in the House of Commons as a Member of Parliament for 26 years. Upon the death of the 5th Marquess in 1884, his eldest son Charles became the 6th Marquess. It was the 6th Marquess's wife, Lady Londonderry, who was the model for the famous Lady Roehampton in Vita Sackville-West's The Edwardians.

The estate remained in the Londonderry family until 1987, although it had been let as a training school for teachers from 1945 until 1960, during which time it lost most of its original contents through sales and breakages.

Hall spent £4,000,000 to restore the house, hiring Rupert Lord to oversee the restoration; he later moved his company headquarters, as well as his home, into the mansion. It is now a special event venue owned by the Hall family and, while much of the estate has been given over to residential and light-industrial development, the parkland around the house has been preserved. The original walled garden has also been restored as a tourist attraction and hospitality venue.

Royal visits
King Edward VII and Queen Alexandra (as Prince and Princess of Wales before 1901) were frequent visitors to Wynyard.  As King, Edward presided over a meeting of the Privy Council there in 1903 — the first time the Council had met in a house belonging to a subject since 1625.

King George V also visited as Prince of Wales, including in November 1902.

Developments at Wynyard

There are three areas of housing development (approximately 800 properties in all) within the former Wynyard Estate: Wynyard Village, Wynyard Woods and Wynyard Park. Wynyard Estate's residents include Duncan Bannatyne and many footballers, such as Tommy Miller, Malcolm Christie and Steve Baker. Former residents include Kevin Keegan and Alan Shearer. 

Wynyard Estate has some of the most expensive houses in the North East, as well as the most expensive road in Teesside. Wynyard Park is home to several gated communities, the main one being the Manorside development, a collection of 27 self-built executive homes. There is a golf club on Wellington Drive.

Land north of the A689 has been acquired by Chris Musgrave, a Hartlepool businessman. For a time, Wynyard Park was used on a commercial basis by Samsung. Plans to build eco-friendly housing and parkland have been approved by the local council. They include 2,000 houses, a 3-star hotel, and a 5-star business hotel. A plan to build a £464 million hospital on the site has been abandoned.

In June 2019, a major redevelopment of Wynyard golf club was granted permission. The redevelopment includes a 150 bed luxury hotel and a sporting academy.

See also
Marquess of Londonderry
Londonderry House
Mount Stewart
Plas Machynlleth
Seaham Hall
Loring Hall

References

External links

Wynyard Hall (event venue)
Wynyard Park (housing development)
Wynyard Park entry from the DiCamillo Database of British & Irish Country Houses
Wynyard Hall Photography

Country houses in County Durham
Vane-Tempest-Stewart family
Housing estates in England
Palladian architecture in England